The Metropolitan Club of the City of Washington is a private club in Washington, D.C. The New York Times called it "Washington's oldest and most exclusive club".

History 
On October 1, 1863, six U.S. Treasury Department officials met to discuss the creation of a social and literary club in Washington, D.C. The Metropolitan Club officially organized twelve days later, with 43 members. The first year, dues were $50.

The club's first board of governors included Robert J. Atkinson, Samuel Yorke Atlee, George E. Baker, Spencer M. Clark, Augustine Edwards, John Lorimer Graham, J. Smith Homans, Judge James Hughes, William Hemphill Jones, Edward Jordon, S. H. Kauffman, Charles Knap, Hugh McCullough, George W. Riggs, John G. Stephenson, and Charles M. Walker.

On June 25, 1883, the club acquired a lot on the corner of H Street and 17th Streets for $10. Later In 1883, the club moved into the first purpose-built structure for a club in Washington, D.C. Designed by the architects W. Bruce Gray and Harvey L. Page, the Victorian-style, four-story building was destroyed in a fire in 1904. From 1905 to 1908, the Metropolitan Club met in various rental properties.The club's current home, designed by the architectural firm of Heins & LaFarge of New York, was built from 1904 to 1908. The brick and limestone Renaissance revival building was rebuilt on the 1700 H Street NW lot, two blocks from the White House. In 1925, a two-story annex designed by Frederick H. Brooke of Donn and Deming was added. 

Inside the five-story building, there is a lobby, coat room, card room, a library with 15,000 books, a grill room, a lounge, a dining room, sleeping quarters, and a barbershop. There is also a steam room, an exercise room, and two squash courts. Another room serves as a museum, honoring the governors. Other spaces are for offices, the kitchen, and the wine cellar.

Here, Theodore Roosevelt plotted the Spanish–American War. During the Watergate era, Henry Kissinger would regularly meet there with New York Times journalist James Reston. To ensure confidentiality of such meetings, the club prohibits the use of cell phones or note taking at the tables.

The Metropolitan Club building was listed on the District of Columbia Inventory of Historic Sites since 1964 and it was listed on the National Register of Historic Places in 1995.

in April 2021, the club opened a new open-air rooftop venue, an $11 million project. The space is used for live music, private functions, and smoking cigars.

Membership 
For its first century, the members of the club refused to accept non-white people as members. In 1961, thirty members quit in protest, including Attorney General Robert F. Kennedy. In 1972, the club started accepting Black members. Bishop John T. Walker was the first African American member.

In 1983, there was a five-year waiting list for membership.

Reciprocal clubs 
The Metropolitan Club has reciprocal agreements with the following: 
 
 Boodle's (London)
 Brooks's (London)
 Cercle Royal du Parc (Brussels)
 Círculo de Armas (Buenos Aires)
 Circolo della Caccia (Rome)
 Duquesne Club (Pittsburgh)
 Jockey Club für Österreich (Vienna)
 Jockey Club (Paris)
 Knickerbocker Club (New York)
 Nuevo Club (Madrid)

Notable members 

 Dean Acheson, secretary of state
 Robert J. Atkinson, politician
 George Bancroft, historian and statesman
 Edward Fitzgerald Beale, ambassador, explorer, and surveyor
 Francis Beverly Biddle, attorney general and Nuremberg judge
 Montgomery Blair, politician, lawyer, and postmaster-general
 Rupert Blue, surgeon general
 Phillip Bonsal, ambassador
 Stephen Bonsal, journalist and diplomat
 Count Arnaud de Borchgrave, journalist
 David K.E. Bruce, diplomat
 Edward Burling, attorney
 John Lee Carroll, governor of Maryland
 Salmon P. Chase, treasury secretary and chief justice
 Lucius Eugene Chittenden, register of the treasury
 Spencer M. Clark, superintendent of the National Currency Bureau
 William T. Coleman, transportation secretary
 William Wilson Corcoran, banker and art collector
 Viscomte Henri de Sibour, architect
 George Dewey, admiral of the Navy
 T. Coleman du Pont, senator
 Allen Dulles, CIA director 
 William Crowninshield Endicott, secretary of war
 Rowland Evans, journalist
 James V. Forrestal, defense secretary
 B. B. French, politician
 Hugh S. Gibson, diplomat
 George H. Goodrich, judge
 James Lorimer Graham Jr., attorney
 Katharine Graham, publisher
 Ulysses S. Grant, president, general
 Cary T. Grayson, physician
 Joseph C. Grew, ambassador
 Warren G. Harding, president
 John Hay, secretary of state
 James L. Holloway III, admiral
 Herbert Hoover, president
 Hallett Johnson, ambassador
 Reverdy Johnson, politician
 William Hemphill Jones, politician
 Edward Jordan, solicitor of the treasury
 John F. Kennedy, president
 Jerome H. Kidder, surgeon and astronomer
 Henry Kissinger, diplomat and statesman
 Philander Chase Knox, secretary of state
 Ward H. Lamon, marshal of Washington
 William Henry Fitzhugh Lee, congressman
 Joseph J. Lewis, IRS commissioner
 Robert Todd Lincoln, ambassador and secretary of war
 Walter Lippman, journalist
 Henry Cabot Lodge, statesman
 Nicholas Longworth III, speaker of the House
 Henry Loomis, director of Voice of America and president of the Corp. for Public Broadcasting 
 Arthur MacArthur Jr., general
 Alfred Thayer Mahan, historian and naval theorist
 George C. Marshall, secretary of state
 John J. McCloy, chairman of the World Bank
 Robert McNamara, defense secretary, president of the World Bank
 Andrew Mellon, Treasury Secretary and philanthropist
 Paul Mellon, horse breeder and philanthropist
 Livingston T. Merchant, ambassador
 Nelson Appleton Miles, general
 J. P. Morgan, financier
 Henry Morgenthau Jr., treasury secretary
 Francis G. Newlands, senator
 Kichisaburo Nomura, Japanese ambassador
 John J. Pershing, General of the Armies
 John E. Pillsbury, rear admiral
 David Dixon Porter, admiral
 James "Scotty" Reston, journalist
 George Washington Riggs, banker
 Franklin D. Roosevelt, president
 Theodore Roosevelt, president
 Elihu Root, secretary of state
 John McAllister Schofield, secretary of war
 Alexander Shepherd, governor of Washington, D.C.
 John Sherman, senator
 William Tecumseh Sherman, general 
 John G. Stephenson, librarian of Congress
 William Howard Taft, president and chief justice
 Richard Wallach, mayor of Washington, D.C.
 John T. Walker, bishop
 James M. Wayne, supreme court justice
 George Washington Vanderbilt II, art collector
 James W. Wadsworth, senator
 William B. Webb, politician, chief of police in Washington D.C.
 George Peabody Wetmore, governor of Rhode Island
 Henry White, ambassador, and one of the signers of the Treaty of Versailles
 John Lorimer Worden, rear admiral

References

External links

The Metropolitan Club of the City of Washington website
"Writings of Walter Lippmann", broadcast from the Metropolitan Club from C-SPAN's American Writers

1863 establishments in Washington, D.C.
Buildings and structures completed in 1908
Clubhouses in Washington, D.C.
Clubhouses on the National Register of Historic Places in Washington, D.C.
Gentlemen's clubs in the United States
Clubs and societies in Washington, D.C.
1908 establishments in Washington, D.C.
Upper class culture in the United States
Heins and LaFarge buildings